Erythroxylum coca is one of two species of cultivated coca.

Description
The branches are straight, and the leaves, which have a green tint, are thin, opaque, oval, and taper at the extremities. A marked characteristic of the leaf is an areolated portion bounded by two longitudinal curved lines, one line on each side of the midrib, and more conspicuous on the underside of the leaf.

The flowers are small, and disposed in little clusters on short stalks; the corolla is composed of five yellowish-white petals, the anthers are heart-shaped, and the pistil consists of three carpels united to form a three-chambered ovary. The flowers mature into red berries.

Unlike Erythroxylum novogranatense, Erythroxylum coca requires very acidic soil conditions. Soil acidity and water acidity need to be below pH 5.5, with the optimal value being pH 3.5, similar to that of Rhododendron potting soils. At pH 6.5 and above, chlorosis and leaf distortion occur.

The leaves are sometimes eaten by the larvae of the moth Eloria noyesi.

Of the two cultivated species of coca, Erythroxylum coca has greater resistance to the use of glyphosate as an herbicide than Erythroxylum novogranatense.

Taxonomy

Among the genus Erythroxylum, cocaine-rich leaves are obtained from four taxa:
 Erythroxylum coca var. coca
 Erythroxylum coca var. ipadu
 Erythroxylum novogranatense var. novogranatense
 Erythroxylum novogranatense var. truxillense

Amazonian coca
Erythroxylum coca var. ipadu, also known as Amazonian coca, is closely related to Erythroxylum coca var. coca, from which it originated relatively recently. E. coca var. ipadu does not escape cultivation or survive as a feral or wild plant like E. coca var. coca   It has been suggested that due to a lack of genetic isolation to differentiate it from E. coca var. coca, E. coca var. ipadu may be better defined as a distinct cultivar than a taxonomic variety.

Unlike the other species of coca which are propagated through seeds, E. coca var. ipadu, which rarely produce seeds, is propagated through stem cuttings which remain viable for several weeks if kept moist. Since Amazonian coca is vegetatively propagated, entire plantations may be populated from the same clone.  E. coca var. ipadu is specially adapted to the shifting agriculture of semi-nomadic Amazonian peoples.  Since cuttings of E. coca var. coca do not easily root, it is likely that E. coca var. ipadu has been artificially selected for its ease of vegetative propagation.
In contrast to the Andean E. coca var. coca, Amazonian E. coca var. ipadu is typically a weaker plant evidenced by the fact that after a few years plants lose their vigor and easily fall prey to disease or insect infestation. Overharvesting can speed up this process.

Amazonian coca is prepared differently than the other three cultivated cocas. After fire-toasting the leaves dry, they are pulverized. Once sifted, the powder is combined with ashes from plants which serve as the necessary alkaline admixture for coca chewing.

See also 
 Coca alkaloids

References

Citations

Sources 

 Turner C. E., Elsohly M. A., Hanuš L., Elsohly H. N. Isolation of dihydrocuscohygrine from Peruvian coca leaves. Phytochemistry 20 (6), 1403-1405 (1981)
 History of Coca. The Divine Plant of the Incas by W. Golden Mortimer, M.D. 576 pp. And/Or Press San Francisco, 1974. This title has no ISBN.

External links 

 Coca leaf: Myths and Reality website of the Transnational Institute (TNI)
 Unscheduling the coca leaf, UN Drug Control website of the Transnational Institute (TNI)
 Coca leaf news page – Alcohol and Drugs History Society
 Erythroxylum coca flower closeup

coca 
Flora of the Andes
Flora of the Amazon
Flora of western South America
Crops originating from the Americas
Medicinal plants of South America
Taxa named by Jean-Baptiste Lamarck
Coca
 Bolivian culture